"Ode to the Motherland" is a patriotic song of the People's Republic of China, written and music composed by Wang Shen (26 October 1918–October 15, 2007) during the period immediately after the founding of the People's Republic of China (1949–1951). It is sometimes honoured as "the second national anthem" of the PRC. The song was performed in the opening ceremonies of the 2008 Summer Olympics, 2019 Military World Games and the 2022 Winter Olympics (during China's entry at the Parade of Nations).

During the Cultural Revolution, its name was Ode to the Socialist Motherland and the lyrics heavily referenced communism and praise of Mao Zedong.

It is the opening music of the radio programmes News and Newspapers Summary and National Network News on China National Radio. Also, it is the closing music of some of CNR's radio channels.

Origin 
Wang Shen, a musician from the nearby city of Tianjin, started writing this song in late September 1950, shortly after he saw the sea of fluttering Five Star Red Flags at Tiananmen Square during the preparation period for the first National Day of the People's Republic of China, which was to be held on 1 October that year. The song had become very popular firstly in Tianjin, then spreading to Beijing. The song's lyrics and its music composition were officially published on 15 September 1951 in the People's Daily, being promoted widely by the Ministry of Culture of China in time for the National Day festivities.

See also 
 Historical Chinese anthems
 "National Flag Anthem of the Republic of China"
 "Ode to the Red Flag"
 Cultural Revolution
 Maoism
 "Sailing the Seas Depends on the Helmsman"
 "The East Is Red"
 "Without the Communist Party, There Would Be No New China"

References

External links
 
 
 

National symbols of the People's Republic of China
Chinese patriotic songs
Maoist China propaganda songs